Rei Qilimi (born 10 June 1996) is an Albanian professional footballer who plays as an attacking midfielder for Albanian club Egnatia Rrogozhinë and the Albania national under-21 football team.

Club career

Early career
Qilimi started his youth career with Dinamo Tirana at age of 14. After spending 2 season here, he moved at Partizani Tirana. At Partizani he was promoted to the first team during the 2014–season but didn't made its first team debut. In February 2016 he was returned to Dinamo Tirana where he managed to make his professional debut and played until 10 October 2016 where he signed with Tirana B. During the 2016–17 season he played 22 matches in the Albanian Second Division where in most of them he was team's Captain and managed to score 6 goals.

International career
Qilimi received his first international call up at the Albania national under-21 football team by coach Alban Bushi for a gathering between 14–17 May 2017 with most of the players selected from Albanian championships.

Career statistics

Club

Honours

Tirana
 Albanian Supercup (1) : 2017
 Albanian First Division : Winner Group B
 Albanian First Division : 2017-2018

References

External links
Rei Qilimi profile FSHF.org

1996 births
Living people
People from Sarandë
Albanian footballers
Albania youth international footballers
Albania under-21 international footballers
Association football midfielders
FK Dinamo Tirana players
KF Tirana players
KS Egnatia Rrogozhinë players
Kategoria e Parë players
Kategoria e Dytë players